Sinap  is a village in Erdemli district of Mersin Province, Turkey. The population of the village was 155. as of 2012. The name of the village probably means "underwater". The castle ruin Sinap Kalesi proves that the area around Sinap was inhabited during the ancient and early medieval ages. The later history of the village is more or less intermingled with that of Karayakup village. Up to 1989 Sinap was a part of Karayakup. The main economic activity is farming. Figs and other fruits are the main crops. Goat and cattle breeding are other activities.

References

Villages in Erdemli District